Kamyshlovsky Uyezd (Камышловский уезд) was one of the subdivisions of the Perm Governorate of the Russian Empire. It was situated in the southeastern part of the governorate. Its administrative centre was Kamyshlov.

Demographics
At the time of the Russian Empire Census of 1897, Kamyshlovsky Uyezd had a population of 248,128. Of these, 99.7% spoke Russian, 0.1% Tatar and 0.1% Polish as their native language.

References

 
Uezds of Perm Governorate
History of Sverdlovsk Oblast